Mangare is a village in the Zonsé Department of Boulgou Province in south-eastern Burkina Faso. As of 2005, the village had a population of 441.

References

Populated places in the Centre-Est Region
Boulgou Province